Bathynellacea is an order of crustaceans which live interstitially in groundwater. They are found on every continent except Antarctica, although they are missing from some islands, including Fiji, New Caledonia and the Caribbean islands. There are two families, Bathynellidae and Parabathynellidae; a third family, "Leptobathynellidae", is considered a synonym of Parabathynellidae.

References

External links

Syncarida
Crustacean orders
Freshwater crustaceans